Matilde De Rubertis (born 24 March 1982), known professionally as Matilde Davoli, is an Italian indie-pop songwriter, producer and sound engineer.

Matilde was born in Lecce, and started her musical career in 2001 with the band Studiodavoli and after the 2006 she found another musical project Girl With The Gun with her friend and producer Populous.
Her first solo album is called I'm Calling You From My Dreams and it was released for the art label  Loyal To Your Dreams in June 2015. At the present she's working as a sound engineer at the recording studio Sudestudio.

Discography
Studiodavoli - Megalopolis (2004)
Studiodavoli - Decibel For Dummies (2006)
Girl With The Gun - S/T (2008)
Girl With The Gun - Ages (2014)

Solo Discography
I'm Calling You From My Dreams (2015)
Home (2021)

Collaborations
Giorgio Tuma - Uncolerd (Swing' n' Pop Around Rose) (2004)
Populous - Queu For Love (2005)
Giorgio Tuma - My Vocalese Funfair (2008)
Indian Wells - Pause (2014)
Giorgio Tuma - This Life Denied Me Your Love (2016)

Sound Engineer's Productions
Thousands Millions - Rock Days (2010)
Lucia Manca - S/T (2011)
Life & Limb - S/T (2012)
Indian Wells - Night Drops (2012)
Gianluca De Rubertis - Autoritratti Con Oggetti (2012)
Echopark - Trees (2013)
Many Love Ska-Jazz - Dreamlike (2014)
Indian Wells - Pause (2014)
Girl With The Gun - Ages (2014)
Matilde Davoli - I'm Calling You From My Dreams (2015)
Laetitia Sadier- Dry Fruit, (song) (2015)
Delta Club - Fortitude EP (2016)
Giorgio Tuma - The Life Denied Me Your Love (2016)
Echopark - Ties (2017)
Indian Wells - Where The World Ends (2017)
I'm Not A Blonde - The Blonde Album (2018)
Lucia Manca - Maledetto e Benedetto (2018)
Soul Island - Shards (2018)

External links
 Loyal To Your Dreams
 Facebook
 Twitter
 Soundcloud

References

1982 births
Living people
Indie pop musicians
Italian women singer-songwriters
Italian singer-songwriters
Italian record producers
Audio production engineers
21st-century Italian singers
21st-century Italian women singers
Italian women record producers